The 1979 Rutgers Scarlet Knights football team represented Rutgers University in the 1979 NCAA Division I-A football season. In their seventh season under head coach Frank R. Burns, the Scarlet Knights compiled an 8-3 record while competing as an independent. The team outscored its opponents 243 to 174. Against ranked opponents, the team lost, 45-10, to #7 Penn State and defeated #17 Tennessee, 13-7. The team's statistical leaders included Ed McMichael with 1,529 passing yards, Albert Ray with 567 rushing yards, and David Dorn with 468 receiving yards.

Schedule

Roster

References

Rutgers
Rutgers Scarlet Knights football seasons
Rutgers Scarlet Knights football